Kyrylo Serhiyovych Zaykov (born 28 April 2001) is a Ukrainian professional footballer who plays as a centre-back.

Club career

Alians Lypova Dolyna 
He made his professional debut for Alians Lypova Dolyna in the winning Ukrainian Cup match against Kramatorsk on 18 August 2021.

References

External links
 

2001 births
Living people
Sportspeople from Kryvyi Rih
Ukrainian footballers
Association football defenders
FC Dnipro players
SC Dnipro-1 players
FC Alians Lypova Dolyna players
Ukrainian First League players